Lithium nitride is a compound with the formula Li3N. It is the only stable alkali metal nitride. The solid has a reddish-pink color and high melting point.

Preparation and handling
Lithium nitride is prepared by direct combination of elemental lithium with nitrogen gas:
6 Li + N2   → 2 Li3N
Instead of burning lithium metal in an atmosphere of nitrogen, a solution of lithium in liquid sodium metal can be treated with N2.
Lithium nitride reacts violently with water to produce ammonia:
Li3N  +  3 H2O   →   3 LiOH  + NH3

Structure and properties
alpha-Li3N (stable at room temperature and pressure) has an unusual crystal structure that consists of two types of layers, one sheet has the composition Li2N− contains 6-coordinate N centers and the other sheet consists only of lithium cations.

Lithium nitride shows ionic conductivity for Li+, with a value of c. 2×10−4Ω−1cm−1, and an (intracrystal) activation energy of c. 0.26eV (c. 24 kJ/mol). Hydrogen doping increases conductivity, whilst doping with metal ions (Al, Cu, Mg) reduces it. The activation energy for lithium transfer across lithium nitride crystals (intercrystalline) has been determined to be higher at c. 68.5 kJ/mol. The alpha form is a semiconductor with band gap of c. 2.1 eV.

Reaction with hydrogen at under 300 °C (0.5 MPa pressure) produces lithium hydride and lithium amide.

Lithium nitride has been investigated as a storage medium for hydrogen gas, as the reaction is reversible at 270 °C. Up to 11.5% by weight absorption of hydrogen has been achieved.

Reacting lithium nitride with carbon dioxide results in amorphous carbon nitride (C3N4), a semiconductor, and lithium cyanamide (Li2CN2), a precursor to fertilizers, in an exothermic reaction.

References

See also
 WebElements

Nitrides
Lithium compounds